{{DISPLAYTITLE:C11H14N2S}}
The molecular formula C11H14N2S (molar mass: 206.307 g/mol, exact mass: 206.0878 u) may refer to:

 Pyrantel
 Tiquinamide

Molecular formulas